MV Xin Guang Hua is a semi-submersible heavy-lift ship operated by COSCO Shipping.  She is the largest Chinese vessel of her type and the second-largest in the world, exceeded only by BOKA Vanguard.

History
Xin Guang Hua was ordered from Guangzhou Shipyard International by COSCO under the name Guang Hua Kou.  Construction begin in March 2015, when the first steel for the ship was cut.  She was launched on 28 April 2016, and entered service in December 2016.  Shortly before her delivery, COSCO merged with China Shipping to form a new company that retained the COSCO name; during the merger, Guang Hua Kou was renamed Xin Guang Hua.

Design
Xin Guang Hua was jointly designed by Vuyk Engineering Rotterdam and MARIC. She has a gross tonnage of 84,239 GT and a deadweight tonnage of 98,370 DWT. She has a diesel-electric propulsion system, with six diesel powered generators providing  each to dual propellers and four thrusters.

References

Semi-submersibles
Heavy lift ships
2016 ships
Ships built in China